Beeline is a software-as-a-service company dealing with sourcing and managing the extended workforce. The company ranks among the largest vendor management system (VMS) providers in terms of total temp/contract spend and outsourced spend in Staffing Industry Analysts' 2017 VMS Markets Development Summary report. The company was sold in July 2018 to New Mountain Capital. As of March 2021, Beeline announced that it is now going to market as an extended workforce platform.

History
Beeline was founded in 1999 as the workforce business unit of MPS Group, Inc. in Jacksonville, Florida. The company was among the first to offer VMS.

In December 2016, Chicago-based private equity firm GTCR acquired Beeline and merged the company with IQNavigator, previously a competitor in the workforce management marketplace. The merged company operates under the Beeline brand name.

In March 2017, Beeline was named a leader “for contingent workers and for consulting and other services” in The Forrester Wave: Services Procurement, Q1, 2017 report by Forrester Research, Inc., and Gartner, Inc. ranked Beeline first for Statement of Work Procurement in its Critical Capabilities for Services Procurement Solutions report.

In July 2018, Beeline announced that it had been acquired by New Mountain Capital, a New York City-based private equity firm, for an undisclosed amount.

Partnerships 
Beeline collaborates with a number of partner organizations including talent providers, enterprise software providers, and managed services providers (MSPs). Strategic MSP partners include Allegis Global Solutions, Hayes Talent Solutions, KellyOCG, Pontoon, and most recently Pinnacle Group.

References

External links
Beeline Login Guide
OKR  Glossary

Software companies established in 1999
Software companies based in Florida
Companies based in Jacksonville, Florida
1999 establishments in Florida
Cloud computing providers
Business software companies
Human resource management software
American subsidiaries of foreign companies
2018 mergers and acquisitions
Private equity portfolio companies
Software companies of the United States
Technology companies based in the Jacksonville area